George Chubb, 1st Baron Hayter (1848–1946), was a British businessman.

George Chubb may also refer to:

George Chubb, 3rd Baron Hayter (1911–2003), British industrialist and politician
George Chubb (cricketer)

See also
Chubb (disambiguation)